Lake Ridge High School, or LRHS, is a secondary school located in Mansfield, Texas, serving grades 9-12. It is one of seven Mansfield Independent School District high schools. Its mascot is the eagle.

Enrollment statistics 
As of the 2015-2016 school year, there were 2,106 students enrolled, 71 percent of which were minority students. 24 percent were economically disadvantaged, with 19 percent qualifying for free lunch and 5 percent for reduced price lunch.

Feeder schools
The following elementary schools feed into Lake Ridge High School:

 Daulton (partial)
 Miller
 Norwood (partial)
 Perry (partial)
 Smith
Spencer

The following intermediate schools feed into Lake Ridge High School:

 Lillard
 Martinez (partial)

The following middle schools feed into Lake Ridge High School:

Jones
McKinzey (partial)

References

Further reading
 
 

Public high schools in Tarrant County, Texas
Mansfield Independent School District high schools
2012 establishments in Texas